Heliogaster is a sequestrate genus of fungi in the family Boletaceae. This is a monotypic genus, containing the single species Heliogaster columellifer, found in Japan. The genus was first described in 2010, to accommodate the species formerly named Octaviania columellifera by Kobayasi in 1937.

References

Boletaceae
Fungi of Asia
Monotypic Boletales genera
Taxa described in 2010
Secotioid fungi